There are two species of lizard named neotropical green anole:
 Anolis biporcatus, found in Mexico, Central America, Colombia, and Venezuela
 Anolis parvauritus, found in Colombia and Ecuador